Harriet's Halloween Candy is a 1982 children's picture book written and illustrated by Nancy L. Carlson. It was published by Carolrhoda Books.

Summary
Harriet doesn't want to share her Halloween candy with her little brother. She is running out of places to hide her candy so she tries to think of a solution.

Reception
 It was adapted into a Broadway play.
 The book is used in schools to teach number sorting.
 A math book uses the book to teach number sorting in schools.

References

1982 children's books
American picture books
Halloween children's books